Tell the Truth! (Havary Praŭdu) is a campaign in Belarus, which was started on 25 February 2010 by educational and research institution "Movement Forward" and is supported by some social public figures.

Belarusian poet Uladzimir Niaklajeu is the founder and former leader of the campaign. For a long time, the objective of the campaign was to collect and distribute true information about the situation in the society and state and only 6 month after Niaklajeu declared about the true objective of the campaign – victory in the coming presidential elections.

In May 2010, dozens of activists of the campaign were subjected to persecution by Belarusian authorities. 
The campaign has become a basis for nominating Uladzimir Niaklajeu as a candidate on presidential elections of 2010 and it continued after the end of the elections.

Fast address

The idea of the campaign was first mentioned on 24 February 2010 on the celebration of 75-year jubilee of the national poet of Belarus Rygor Baradulin. This is when Niaklajeu said:

On 25 February Uladzimir Niaklajeu manifested an address "Let's tell the truth together" to the citizens of the Republic of Belarus. This address was supported by a historian and human rights activist Tatiana Protko, organizer of foundation "Children of Chernobyl" professor Genadij Grushevoj, chairman of Belarusian Association of Journalists Zhanna Litvina, academician Radim Goretskij, people's artist of Belarus Zinaida Bondarenko, grand chess master Viktor Kupreichik, poets Hienadz Buraukin and Rygor Borodulin, political scientist Alexander Feduta.

Press conference of the founders of campaign was held in the hotel Crowne Plaza in Minsk. This is when Niaklajeu said:

History of the campaign

"Tell the Truth!" postcard
The first action was the distribution of postcards with the logo of campaign, in which people were asked to write about local problems and send it to the Presidential Administration of Belarus. On 19 April Neklaijev made an attempt to deliver several postcards personally, but they refused to accept them in the Presidential Administration because he wasn't an official representative of their authors.

At the same time Uladzimir Niaklajeu and other activists of campaign organized a series of trips around the country. These trips included meetings with local population and discussions of issues, which the people were most concerned about. In some bringing  attention and public discussion helped to solve some local issues, or at least make their resolution stage more active.

Monitoring of local elections
Before the beginning of the session of Central Commission of the Republic of Belarus on Elections and the Conduction of National Referendums, which was dedicated to the results of local elections in the country, delegates of the "Tell the Truth!" campaign have handed over an analytical report to the Committee. In the report Uladzimir Niaklajeu states that "You can call this anything but elections. People were treated scornfully on these elections. People had no choice on these elections. Elections were held according to most oppressive scheme possible".

One of the members of Minsk Election Committee and authors of monitoring Sergey Vozniak said:

It is also mentioned in the report that 93% of members of pro-presidential parties and only 14% of opposition party members were approved to be included in precinct electoral committees. Authors of monitoring assume that the reason for that lies in the fact that highest degree of falsification takes place in the precinct electoral committees. It also points out the unprecedented pressure of authorities on candidates and activists in order to make them withdraw from election campaign. It is mentioned in the report that as a result of these actions around 30% of population, which is in opposition with the policies of authorities, is practically not represented in the system of local councils.

Collecting of signatures for naming a street after Vasil Bykaŭ

The day before the 65th anniversary of the victory of USSR in the Great Patriotic War the campaign "Tell the Truth!" started an action of commemorating the name of an outstanding Belarusian writer and veteran Vasil Bykaŭ. They announced the start of collecting signatures to name a newly built metro station,  a street in Minsk and a street in Grodno after Bykaŭ.
Collecting of signatures was started in Minsk on 9 May 2010. One of the suggestions was to rename Uljanovskaja street, which is located not far from Lenin street (two streets in the honour of one man), with Bykaŭ's name. Collection of signatures in Grodno, where the writer lived for 25 years, was started on 11 May. As reported by organizers, by 19 June 65 thousand signatures in Minsk and 5 thousand signatures in Grodno were collected to commemorate the name of Bykaŭ.

Several well-known personalities in Belarus put their names down for a street named after Bykaŭ: writer Hienadz Buraukin, first Prime Minister of Belarus Vyachaslau Kebich, labour union activist Alexander Buhvostov, academician Alexander Vojtovich and many others.

On 30 June 2010 Grodno city committee on toponymy recommended to name a new street that will be constructed in the following year after Vasil Bykaŭ. Nevertheless, nothing is known about the connection between the signatures collecting action with this recommendation.

On 12 July 105 thousand of signatures under a demand to rename one of the streets in Minsk with the name of Bykaŭ were handed over to Minsk City Executive Committee.

On 16 July the activists of a campaign in Grodno handed of over following proposals to the City Executive Committee:
 Name one of the streets or squares of Grodno after Bykaŭ;
 Install a memorial plate on the house, where he lived;
 Improve the conditions of activity of Bykaŭ's museum in Grodno;
 Organise public consultations in the "round table" format to select a street or a square to name after Bykaŭ.

7414 signatures were collected to support these proposals.

On 21 July the session of Grodno City Executive Committee added an extra room to the Bykaŭ museum. Street naming issue was not on the agenda.

Hundred faces of unemployment

On 2 June at the Zaslavl water storage basin near Minsk the leaders of campaign presented a collected book «100 faces of unemployment», dedicated to the problem of employment in Belarus. The collected book contains stories of a hundred people, who could not find a job for a long period of time. Among them were famous people of the country as well as ordinary citizens. Uladzimir Niaklajeu said that the founders of campaign "Tell the Truth!" are supporting the programme of presidential candidate of United Civil Party Jaroslav Romanchuk "Million new jobs for Belarus".

Regional activities
Apart the all-republican actions the activists of the campaign also initiated a series of local actions. For example, on 2 June in Mogilev they started collecting signatures for reconstruction of one of the local roads and on 10 June – for publication the time-table of the reception of citizens by deputies of local council in local mass media. Several other actions took place in June in Brest, Gorki, Orsha and other towns of Belarus.

On 28 June the activists of the campaign organised an ecological action – they cleaned the lake Svetilovskoje in Baranovichi district of Brest region. Identical action was organised on 10 July in Orsha: with the assistance of municipal executive committee the activists of campaign cleaned the river Kuteenka. On 28 July they were cleaning the territory of forest-park in Grodno. Several actions on cleaning the banks of local basins was also organised in the Brest region.

Beginning of political activity
Several observers commented that the campaign is related to future presidential elections and can become a resource for nominating a presidential candidate. Before 2 September Uladzimir Niaklajeu denied all the assumptions that he will be nominating his candidature or said that he will make a decision no sooner than the elections will be officially announced.
On 19 July on the meeting with Belarusian businessmen Niaklajeu announced that he is planning to become a delegate of 4th All-Belarusian National Assembly, which was supposed to take place in fall 2010. He assumed that it will be enough to collect 20 thousand signatures of citizens. In his interview for newspaper Belarusians and Market Niaklajeu agreed that this step means that the campaign is moving from the field of social activity into political field.

On 27 August the sub-total of the activity of the campaign was made. On the press conference, the organisers informed the reporters that 80 actions in 33 cities and towns were organised for a period since the campaign was started. As a result, 55 thousand signatures were collected under demands to solve a series of local problems. Uladzimir Niaklajeu declared that the activists managed to attract the attention of citizens of Belarus with their initiatives and social emphasis of the campaign helped people to better understand that it is necessary to solve problems on global level, in the country scale. He stated that many local bureaucrats are sympathizing with the campaign "Tell the Truth!"

On 2 September 2010 on the air of radio station "Moscow Echo" Niaklajeu announced his plans to stand for presidential elections in Belarus in the future election campaign. On 23 September he filed an application for registering an initiative group for presidential candidate nomination. The group was headed by one of the closest companions of Niaklajeu in "Tell the Truth!" campaign Andrej Dmitriev. The total of initiative group was 3275 people, 193 829 signatures were collected for nominating Niaklajeu. According to official data, which Niaklajeu and his supporters claim to be falsified, 1,78% of voters voted for Niaklajeu.

Persecution and controversy
 On the 6th in Minsk, 9 thousand of postcards with campaign logo were confiscated from activists of the campaign without any legal reasons. According to the activists, their car was stopped by road police officers who checked their documents and ordered to carry over the postcards from their car in the police car and follow them to Regional Office of Internal Affairs of Central district of Minsk for interrogation.
 On 11 March, Niaklajeu arrived to the office of newspaper Borisov News for a pre-announced press conference, but the announced phone number appeared to be unavailable.
 On 25 Aprilz the police searched a private house in Mozyr looking for drugs during the meeting of city dwellers with Niaklajeu.
 On 1 May in Minsk, 10 activists of the campaign, who were distributing air balloons on the Victory Square, were arrested by the police, sent to Regional Office of Internal Affairs of Central district and later released without official explanation.

Mass searches, seizures and arrests on 18 May
On 18 May agents of law enforcement agencies came simultaneously to offices of series of social organisations and apartments of activists throughout the country.

Around 1:00 pm reporters started to receive multiple calls from different cities that the police is arresting activists of campaign and attempts to enter apartments for conducting searches. Several men in civilian clothes came to the office of campaign in Minsk and ordered everyone to stay inside. According to different sources of information from 10 to 20 people were arrested only in Minsk. They were transported to Regional Office of Internal Affairs of Lenin district where they were informed that they will be witnessing in criminal case commenced according to part 1 of article 250 of Criminal Code of the Republic of Belarus "Distribution of deliberately misleading information about goods or services". Searches and arrests were also present in Grodno, Gomel, Mogilev, Brest, Bobrujsk, Soligorsk, Slonim, Volkovysk, Borisov, Belynichi and several other towns. In most of the cases all computer equipment, information carriers and printed materials were seized.

Sociological laboratory Novak, headed by professor Andrey Vardomatskij, was also searched. All financial documentation of the organisation was seized. House of Andrej Vardomatskij was also searched.

In Gomel apartment of ex-People's Deputy of the USSR Jurij Vorozhentsev police officers confiscated 3 laptops, one of which belongs to his 3-year daughter, his son's computer, video camera, mobile phones, carriers of information – CD disks, floppy disks, flash memory cards, videotapes and several thousands of US dollars. On 20 May Vorozhentsev was interrogated as a witness of a criminal case. Personal money, saved for medical treatment, confiscated from political scientist Svetlana Naumova.

According to Niaklajeu, everything but nails in the walls was taken away from the Minsk office. As of 29 July the office was still sealed.

Three activists of the campaign – Uladzimir Niaklajeu, main editor of newspaper Comrade, member of Central Bureau of "Fair World" Party Sergey Vozniak, and international coordinator of United Civil Party Andrey Dmitrijev – were arrested for 3 days and released on 21 May without being charged. They were informed that they were suspects in a criminal case, opened by the Ministry of Internal Affairs.

In total 65 persons from 22 settlements were searched, interrogated and arrested.

Version of the Ministry of Internal Affairs
As mentioned in the press release of Ministry of Internal Affairs of Belarus dated 21 May the reason for arresting activists and seizures of equipment and documentation was a criminal case, opened according to the request of the owners of publishing company Dixand. They complained about "unauthorized use of brand name, legal address and other information about their firm on printed goods of Dixand. Later the press release says that after investigatory actions it was established that the printed goods were produced by Dixand "by the order of the organizers of movement "Forward" and civil campaign Tell the Truth! Vozniak and Niaklajeu. Ministry of Internal Affairs declares that violations of law by Niaklajeu and Vozniak were "numerous and systematic", but does not specify concrete unlawful actions incriminated to them.

Ministry of Internal Affairs also states that as a result of searches were seized "2 units of firearms, 39 bullets of different caliber, 6 units of cold steel arms and also plant-based narcotic drug". All these items were found in the apartment of campaign activist Valentina Matusevich. Her 25-year-old son who, according to her, had almost no relation to campaign, was arrested and sent to prison.

Version of the supporters of Uladzimir Niaklajeu
Niaklajeu called the opening of criminal case totally unreasonable and politically motivated. Sergey Vozniak says that 4 weeks before the events he came to one of the printing houses of Minsk to evaluate a possibility of printing the materials of campaign "Tell the Truth!" but had no further business with that printed house. Vozniak also mentioned that the representatives of financial investigation agencies already interrogated him on this matter before the arrest. Like Niaklajeu, he also considers searches and arrests to be politically motivated.

The director of Dixand Alexander Boldyrev informed the Belarusian editor's office of Liberty Radio that he knows nothing about a criminal case related to his company.

Valentina Matusevich, in whose apartment the police found weapons and drugs, explained that her arrested son was several times on duty in the office of the campaign but was barely interested in politics. Uladzimir Niaklajeu also said that he doesn't know Matusevich, who supposedly was his bodyguard. This rumour was also denied by Valentina Matusevich. Niaklajeu also said that he never had bodyguards and construction cartridges found in his apartment during the search the police attempted to register as bullets.

Valentina Matusevich explained to the reporters that "fire arms" found in her apartment are a gas gun and an airgun pistol (Nikita was a professional airgun shooter). The bullets that were found were blank and the collection of knives was collected by Nikita's father 30 years ago. The "plant-based narcotic drug" are herbs that Valentina used for her own treatment.

Protests against persecution
On 20 May the chairman of European Parliament Jerzy Buzek expressed "great concern about deterioration of situation with human rights in Belarus" related to mass persecution of activists of "Tell the Truth!" campaign. He said that the EU may reconsider its relations with Belarus and demanded to "immediately stop repressions and persecution of civil society organisations and return on the track of democratization" from Belarusian authorities.

Deep concern about repressions against the campaign "Tell the Truth!" was also expressed by the embassy of Great Britain, a presiding country in European Union. A similar concern was expressed by the Chargé d'Affaires of USA in Belarus Mark Boshetti and FIDH.

The head of European Parliament delegation on relations with Belarus Jacek Protasevich declaimed against "politically motivated" searches and noted that the persecution by authorities is caused by the activity of the campaign, which was "aimed at providing true information and monitoring of presidential elections in Belarus".

Representatives of 33 social organizations, including famous scientists and environmentalists of different countries signed a petition to the public prosecution office, Ministry of Internal Affairs and Presidential Admisnistration of Belarus, which expressed protest against persecution of Jurij Vorozhentsev and seizure of personal belongings of the family of a «witness in a case» and demand to restore legal justice. Other organisations and social activists also came out against the persecution.

Seizure of signatures
As informed by the press-secretary of the campaign Julia Rymashevskaja "most evident hunting" was organized after collected signatures for naming one of the streets and metro stations after Vasil Bykov. Ten thousand signatures were confiscated during the search on 18 May in the office of campaign. On 5 July a car, in which 30 thousand more signatures were kept, was towed and sealed. On 9 July signatures were confiscated by the police during a car search related to the above-mentioned criminal case.

On 7 July the apartment, which was rented to use as an office of the campaign was robbed by the unknown. Nothing was missing accept 50 thousand signatures. Organizers of the campaign said on the press conference that all collected signatures were scanned and are available in electronic format.

Arrest of Michail Bashura
On the evening of 6 August, agents of KGB arrested an activist of the campaign Michail Bashura and handed him over to officers of Soviet district Regional Office of Internal Affairs of Minsk. At the same day they opened a criminal case according to part 2 of article 380 of Criminal Code (forgery, production, use or sale of fake documents, stamps, formsheets). They claimed that Bashura had overstated his income when he went a guarantee for receiving a credit in a bank in 2008. On 9 August his detention pending trial was extended without charge. On 17 August Bashura was charged with the commission of a crime according to two parts of article 380: forgery of documents aimed to be used by the producer and same actions, conducted by previous concert by a group of people. During investigation, Bashura was kept under arrest. Human rights activists and Uladzimir Niaklajeu consider this case to be politically motivated.

Niaklajeu claims that the authorities changed their tactics and now they are intimidating all activists. At the same day all pickets of the campaign in Mogilev region ware banned, several activists were arrested, one of them – Michail Pashkevich – received a fine of 1,4 million Belarusian rubles.

Liquidation of the organization
On 3 June the official organizer of the campaign – research and educational institution Movement Forward – received a notification from Minsk City Executive Committee in which they were informed that the Economic Court of Minsk received a claim to withdraw state registration from the company. On 10 June the court took into account the submissions of lawyers of Movement Forward that it is impossible to present organisational documents that were either confiscated by investigation or are located in a sealed office. The court agreed to make his own request for documentation. On 8 July the court refused the Minsk City Executive Committee in liquidation of the organisation.

Later Minsk City Executive Committee made an attempt to litigate the rental agreement. On 20 July the representative of Minsk City Executive Committee stated in Minsk Commercial Court that the placement was rented for office use against the law because it is a trading placement. Deputy of General Director of company Tina Vlati, which owns the placement, presented papers in court, which prove that the placement is administrative. The representative of Movement Forward Nina Pohlopko thinks that the only purpose of the claim was the liquidation of organisation. On 29 July judge Andrej Oleshkevich satisfied the claim and admitted the rental agreement to be unlawful, although he defeated the claim a day before. In his interview to Belsat channel Niaklajeu announced that the campaign will be continued within the framework of a new organisation.

On 12 October the Commercial Court of Minsk satisfied the claim of Minsk City Executive Committee to withdraw state registration of research and educational institution Movement Forward due to the fact, that its organizers presented deliberately misleading information during registration – rental agreement of the office was admitted to be unlawful because the placement was not designed for an office. Representatives of the organization consider this decision to be not fair, not based on law and claimed that they will certainly take advantage of their right of lodging a complaint.

After the presidential elections of December 2010, in which Uladzimir Niaklajeu took part as a candidate, Ministry of Justice refused to register Tell the Truth!

Opinions about the campaign
The chairman of Belarusian Language Society Named After Frantsysk Skorina, Oleg Trusov, was critical about the campaign due to the fact that all its printed materials are distributed in Russian language.

Politician from the opposition Alexander Milinkevich considers the idea of addressing Presidential Administration to be wrong and finds the aims and sources of campaign financing to be questionable.

The chairman of United Civil Party Anatoly Lebedko criticized the idea of Niaklajeu to be nominated as a delegate of All-Belarusian National Assembly. He considers that the collection of signatures will publicize this non-constitutional and scenical structure. Nevertheless, Belarusian political scientists consider the idea of Niaklajeu to be a well-organized PR action.

Member of Writers Union of Belarus Valerij Grishkovets accused Uladzimir Niaklajeu that the campaign "Tell the Truth!" is created to nominate Uladzimir Niaklajeu for Peace Nobel Prize. Niaklajeu does not agree with this accusation, considers it to be a fantasy and an attempt to bring his social activity into discredit.

At the end of September 2010, Belarusian TV company broadcast a 20-minute program that said that the campaign "Tell the Truth!" is engaged in money laundering and unlawful diversion of funds, which are provided by foreign funds for democratization of Belarusian society.

Reports about company money expenditures were presented in the program as examples of money laundering. The report had articles like: preparation of a car to motor vehicle inspection, psychologist services, florist services, trips to Vilnus. Over US$1000 was spent on each of them. On the next day, a video message was posted on the Internet page of "Tell the Truth!" in which one of the organizers of campaign "Tell the Truth!" Andrei Dmitrijev denies the accusations and names comments on the facts mentioned in the program to be "a mixture of insanity and sick fantasies". Dmitriev also notes that the program was anonymous and had "neither an author nor a director".

Several independent internet mass media ("Solidarity", "Belarusian Guerilla" and others) mentioned and discussed the assumptions that Niaklajeu's campaign is financed by sponsors from Russia. Russian ambassador in Belarus Alexander Surikov commented on this that the Russian government is not involved in financing Belarusian opposition. An expert of campaign "Tell the Truth!" Alexander Feduta states that the campaign is sponsored by Belarusians who are living in Russia.

Candidate of philosophical sciences, ex-director of informational and analytical center of Academy of Public Administration Under the Aegis of the President of the Republic of Belarus Jurij Baranchik noted the genuine novelty of campaign and well-selected ideological basis. According to Baranchik, this is a "first Belarusian political project after 1994" in the sense that it is not financed by external to Belarus powers, but Belarusians, who live in Russia. He believes that this new type of opposition has big perspectives in Belarus as opposed to nationalists. Effectiveness and creativity of the campaign was also noted by political scientist Valerij Karbalevich.

See also
 Censorship in Belarus
 Human rights in Belarus

References

External links

 Tell the Truth official web-site.
 
 

 Свойство говорить правду. Владимир Некляев в гостях у брестчан
 Уладзімер Някляеў: «Мана — падмурак сёньняшняй улады»  (интервью Радио Свобода)
 
 Зачем спецслужбы Беларуси провели акцию «Говори правду»?
 Белорусские власти против кампании «Говори правду!»

 Андрей Дмитриев: в Беларуси нет денег для оппозиции — интервью заместителя руководителя кампании «Говори правду».

Photo and video
 Photo Gallery on Flickr
 Press-conference 25 February 2010.
 Channel on YouTube

Belarusian opposition